The 1890–91 Welsh Amateur Cup was the first season of the Welsh Amateur Cup. The cup was won by Wrexham Victoria who defeated Flint Town 4-1 in the final.

First round

Replay

Second round

Third round

Semi-final

Final

References

1890-91
Welsh Cup
1890–91 domestic association football cups